Telephone numbers in Azerbaijan follow the ITU Telecommunication Standardization Sector E.164 recommended format its telephone numbering plan.

A caller from outside Azerbaijan would dial the international access number (international call prefix) of the originating country (00 for many countries, 011 from NANP areas), then dial the country code (in this case 994), omit the trunk prefix, then dial the two-digit area code, and then the seven-digit local number.

For example, to reach the US embassy in Baku, Azerbaijan, a caller in the United States would dial 011-994-12-498 0335, while a caller in the UK would dial 00-994-12-498 0335. (The area code for Baku is 12.)

For calls within Azerbaijan but outside the caller's area code, the caller would not dial an international access number or country code, but dial the trunk prefix (in this case 0) then the area code, followed by the telephone number. So, for instance, to call the American embassy in Baku from Ganja, Azerbaijan, a caller would dial 012-498 0335.

For a local call (that is, a call in Azerbaijan within the caller's area code) one simply dials the local number: 498 0335.

Area codes in Azerbaijan
On August 1, 2011, Azerbaijan reorganized its national numbering plan for area codes. Only the area codes of Baku, Sumqayit, and the Nakhchivan Autonomous Republic (area codes 12, 18 and 36) remain unchanged. The following tables list both the old and new area codes.

Baku

Sumqayit

Baku region

Shirvan region

Ganja region

Quba region

Shaki region

Lankaran region

Shusha region

Nakhchivan Autonomous Republic

See also
 Telecommunications in Azerbaijan
 Economic regions and districts of Azerbaijan
 Administrative divisions of Azerbaijan

References

Azerbaijan
Telecommunications in Azerbaijan
Azerbaijan communications-related lists